A Stór Is A Stóirín (or A Stór Is A Stóirín: Songs For All Ages) is a studio album by Irish singer Pádraigín Ní Uallacháin with Garry Ó Briain. The album spawned various television and radio appearances for Ní Uallacháin in Ireland and in Britain.

Track listing
CD 1 – A Stór
'S Umbó Aerá
Mo Chailín Rua
Níl 'na Lá
Casadh Cam na Feadarnaí
Dúlamán
Mál Bhán
A Stór A Stór, A Ghrá
Séarlas Óg
Sí Do Mhamó Í
Bó Na Leathadhairce
Gabhaim Molta Bríde
Scadán Amháin
Ó Boró Braindí Braindí
Mullach a' tSí
Fuígfidh Mise An Baile Seo
Téir Abhaile 'Riú
Amhrán Na Bealtaine
Mo Ghile Mear

CD 2 – A Stóirín – For Children
Tá Dhá Ghabhairín Bhuí Agam
Suáilcí Samhailcí
Tairse Abhaile, A Mháirín Ó
Suantraí Hiúdaí
Nead Na Lachan
An Leanbh Nua
Nóra Bheag
Láirín Ó Lúrtha
Carúl Na Nollag
Seoithín Agus Seoithín
Deandraimín Dílis
Péigín Leitir Móir
Cuirfimid Deaindí Deaindí
Mo Bhuachaillín Ceanasach
Bog Braon
Turas Go Gaillimh
An bhFaca Tú Mo Shéamaisín?
Peata Beag do Mháthar

Personnel 
 Pádraigín Ní Uallacháin – vocals
 Gráinne Ní Uallacháin – vocals
 Len Graham – vocals
 Nollaig Casey – fiddle, viola
 Cathal McConnell – flute, tinwhistle
 Máirtín O'Connor – accordion
 Martin Murray – mandolin
 Ruairí Ó hUallacháin – tinwhistle, uilleann pipes
 Garry  Ó Briain – guitar, mandocello, keyboards
 Tommy Hayes – percussion

Release history
A Stór Is A Stóirín was released by Gael Linn in 1994, 2004, 2008 and 2012.

References

External links
 A Stór Is A Stóirín – official website

1994 albums
Pádraigín Ní Uallacháin albums